Contracted is a 2013 American zombie-body horror independent film written and directed by Eric England. It was first released on November 23, 2013, in the United States and stars Najarra Townsend as a young woman that finds herself suffering from a mysterious sexually transmitted disease after a rape. It has been compared to the 2012 film Thanatomorphose, with which it shares similarities. Twitch Film has criticized the movie for its marketing, in which England describes the character Samantha's rape as a "one night stand". The original cast of the first film is featured in a sequel titled  Contracted: Phase II, written by Craig Walendziak and directed by Josh Forbes.  The sequel was released in September 2015.

Plot 

In a morgue, a man named BJ with an Abaddon tattoo has sex with a corpse that has a biohazard symbol on the toe tag; afterward, he handles an empty test tube while washing up.

Samantha is trying to get over a recent break-up with her girlfriend, Nikki. The party's host, Alice, plies her with strong drinks, while Zain offers her drugs. After she becomes heavily inebriated, Samantha is approached by BJ, who offers her a drink. Even though she tells him that she is a lesbian, when she begins to black out, BJ takes her to his car and rapes her.

The next morning, Samantha thinks she is suffering from a bad hangover. She bickers with her mother, who struggles to accept her daughter's lesbianism and is worried that she might have relapsed into hard drug use. Alice tells Samantha that the police are searching for BJ, who Alice had never met. At the restaurant where she works, Samantha has trouble eating and is overly sensitive to noise. When she bleeds heavily from her vagina, she visits her doctor. Despite her protests that she is a lesbian who has not had sex with men for nearly a year, he is suspicious that she has contracted a sexually transmitted disease from heterosexual intercourse because of a rash that has developed in her groin. Samantha is also constantly vomiting a lot of blood and as well as urinating a lot of blood and eventually a maggot falls out of her vagina in the bathroom without her noticing.

Samantha tries to repair her relationship with Nikki, who is rude to her. Samantha is hurt to learn that Nikki had not let her know that a scholarship offer had come in the mail. Meanwhile, her symptoms continue to worsen. Her eyes turn bloodshot, and her hair falls out in clumps. She was on her way to the doctors when her work called and said she needed to be at the restaurant until someone could come in for her. As she is making salad her boss told her to take off her sunglasses and notices her eyes and she says she has pink eye, so he said to squint while bringing the food to the customers. She looks terrible. Pale skins dark blue veins are all over her face along with a sore on the side of her lip. As she goes back into the kitchen she notices something is up with her fingers. Samantha starts to mess with them and she pulls a nail off. Then a woman customer screams and finds a finger nail in her salad. She flees the restaurant and returns to her doctor, who advises her to avoid contact with other people until tests can determine the nature of her disease. Instead, Samantha visits Zain, who gives her heroin. When Alice arrives, she encourages Samantha to talk to the police about her encounter with BJ. Believing that Alice wants to isolate her from her other friends, Samantha argues with her and storms off. Zain reveals to Alice that he sold Rohypnol to BJ at the party.

Samantha stops off at home and argues violently with her mother. She abruptly leaves for her flower competition but is turned away at the door because of her appearance and the condition of her flowered plant.

Samantha turns to Nikki for consolation, but Nikki coldly rejects her and calls her sexually confused. Samantha is enraged, so when Nikki tries to shut the door Samantha slams the door into Nikkis face.  Samantha then chokes Nikki to death. She then drives to Alice's in a rage and Alice tells her to get out of her house and grabs a knife. Samantha says, "you finally have me" and they kiss. Samantha then throws up blood into her mouth. Alice runs away but Samantha violently attacks her and murders her by biting into her throat and then hits her with a blunt object. Losing her sanity, Samantha invites Riley, a man who has had a crush on her, to Alice's house and seduces him, and they engage in Sexual intercourse, but during the process, Riley then comments feeling wet and tingly inside her and then upon withdrawing his penis from her Vagina, he sees an excessive abundant amount of bloody maggots fall out of Samantha's vagina and becomes repulsed. He then goes to the bathroom to vomit and inspect himself including his groin and genitalia, which is covered in massive amount of blood and while wiping himself, he opens the shower curtain and discovers Alice's body in the bathtub. Samantha flees the house. As she drives, she fades out of consciousness and is involved in a car crash. She emerges from the wreckage transformed fully into a zombie. Her mother, who has arrived at the scene, begs the police not to shoot Samantha. As the police caution Samantha against moving, she lunges at her screaming mother.

Cast 
 Najarra Townsend as Samantha Williams
 Caroline Williams as Nancy Williams
 Alice Macdonald as Alice Patrick
 Katie Stegeman as Nikki
 Matt Mercer as Riley McCormick
 Charley Koontz as Zain
 Simon Barrett as Brent "BJ" Jaffe
 Ruben Pla as Doctor
 Dave Holmes as Therapist

Production 
England said that he began working on Contracted due to his wanting to "tell a story within the virus/infection subgenre like we've never seen before" and that he wanted to use sex as a plot device as it was something that "most people can understand and relate to". He wrote the film's script in March 2012 and shot Contracted during a 15-day period in Los Angeles in May of the same year. Casting for the film was difficult due to the limited funds, as well as some actors finding the film's content "too bold" or having scheduling conflicts. Veteran horror actress Caroline Williams was cast as the mother of the main character after England and film producer Matt Mercer approached her via her Facebook page.

England had initially planned to have the film center around the film's protagonist experiencing the loss of her virginity, but changed it to focus on a character that is uncertain of her sexuality and has a prior lifestyle different than the one she currently has. He had also initially planned to have the film set outside of the United States and focus slightly on xenophobia, but did not have the budget to accommodate this and as such, changed the movie's setting to Los Angeles.

Release 
Contracted at Neuchâtel International Fantastic Film Festival on July 7, 2013.  IFC Films released it in the United States in theaters and video on demand on November 22, 2013, and on DVD on March 18, 2014.

Reception 
Rotten Tomatoes, a review aggregator, reports that 50% of 16 surveyed critics gave the film a positive review; the average rating was 4.8/10. Metacritic rated it 48/100 based on 5 reviews.

Rob Staeger of The Village Voice wrote the film moves from moralizing to under-explored themes while remaining full of stereotypical characters. Fangoria compared Contracted to the similarly plotted Thanatomorphose, saying that while both had a similar premise, Contracteds "visual palette is relatively conventional" in comparison. In a mixed review, Andy Webster of The New York Times wrote that the "ending to this fable misses the opportunity for broader metaphorical resonance, but getting there has its own unnerving rewards". In contrast, Martin Tsai of  the Los Angeles Times stated that while the film was "absurd" it was also "compelling" and that it would play well off of the unrelated 2013 film Blue Is the Warmest Colour. Staci Layne Wilson of Dread Central rated it 2.5/5 stars and wrote the film is neither body horror nor a zombie film but simply a gross-out film. Dennis Harvey of Variety called it "a body horror opus" whose vague themes and unlikeable characters are not readily discernible as intentional.

Ben Croll of Twitch Film criticized the film's marketing, which depicts a one-night stand that is opposed by an unambiguous depiction of rape in the film. However, Croll states that the major themes of the film are denial and self-deception, which color Samantha's own perception of the incident.  Sequel 
A sequel featuring the original cast of the first film titled  Contracted: Phase II'', written by Craig Walendziak and directed by Josh Forbes, was released September 4, 2015, in the U.S.

References

External links
 
 
 

2013 films
2013 horror films
2013 independent films
2013 LGBT-related films
American body horror films
American independent films
American zombie films
Films about alcoholism
Films about heroin addiction
Films about infectious diseases
Films about rape in the United States
Films about sexually transmitted diseases
Films about substance abuse
Films directed by Eric England
Films set in Los Angeles
Films shot in Los Angeles
Lesbian-related films
2010s English-language films
2010s American films